Persiciospora is a genus of fungus in the Ceratostomataceae family.

References

External links 

Sordariomycetes genera
Melanosporales
Taxa named by David Leslie Hawksworth
Taxa described in 1982